John Decatur Barry (June 21, 1839 – March 24, 1867) was an officer in the Confederate States Army during the American Civil War. The men he was leading at Chancellorsville mistakenly fired on Confederate General Stonewall Jackson, leading to Jackson's death.

Early life
Barry was born in Wilmington, North Carolina on June 21, 1839. He was educated at the University of North Carolina at Chapel Hill.

Civil War
Barry enlisted in Company I of the 18th North Carolina Infantry when the Civil War began. He was elected captain of Company I in April 1862. The 18th was part of Lawrence O'Bryan Branch's brigade, and took part in all of the major battles with A.P. Hill's Light Division. Barry was wounded at the Battle of Frayser's Farm during the Peninsula Campaign.

Following the Battle of Antietam, Barry was promoted to major. At the Battle of Chancellorsville, Barry gave the order to fire on Stonewall Jackson's party as they attempted to ride through James H. Lane's brigade, believing they were Union cavalry. Despite the error, Barry was promoted to colonel of the 18th North Carolina after the battle. He led the regiment during Pickett's Charge on July 3 at Gettysburg. Throughout the 1864 Overland Campaign, Barry continued to lead the 18th North Carolina.

Lane was wounded at the Battle of Cold Harbor on June 2 and Barry was appointed brigadier general (temporary) to replace him. However, on July 27, at the First Battle of Deep Bottom, Barry was wounded in the right hand, losing two fingers. Because he was disabled and after Lane returned to lead the brigade, the temporary appointment to brigadier general was canceled. In February 1865, Barry was ordered to command a department in North Carolina.

Postbellum activities
Barry died within two years of the surrender of Confederate forces.  Returning home in poor health, he edited a newspaper in Wilmington before dying on March 24, 1867. Some of his friends and family said that Barry "died of a broken heart" for his role in Jackson's death. He is buried in Oakdale Cemetery in Wilmington.

See also

List of American Civil War generals (Acting Confederate)

Notes

References
 And then A.P. Hill Came Up- Biography of John D. Barry
 Eicher, John H., and David J. Eicher, Civil War High Commands. Stanford: Stanford University Press, 2001. .
 Sifakis, Stewart. Who Was Who in the Civil War. New York: Facts On File, 1988. .
 Warner, Ezra J. Generals in Gray: Lives of the Confederate Commanders. Baton Rouge: Louisiana State University Press, 1959. .

External links

1839 births
1867 deaths
American amputees
Burials at Oakdale Cemetery
Confederate States Army brigadier generals
People from Wilmington, North Carolina
People of North Carolina in the American Civil War
Stonewall Jackson
University of North Carolina at Chapel Hill alumni